Uusküla is a village in Rapla Parish, Rapla County in northwestern Estonia.

The Rapla cemetery is located in Uusküla.

Politician, lawyer and military commander Otto Tief (1889–1976) was born in Uusküla.

Gallery

References

 

Villages in Rapla County
Kreis Harrien